The Chinese University of Hong Kong (CUHK), Faculty of Arts is the arts faculty of the Chinese University of Hong Kong.

History 

It was founded in 1963.

One of the Arts Faculty's first generation of graduates, Dr. Yu Ying-shih, a student of Qian Mu, and a former pro-vice Chancellor of the university is a well-known historian and a recipient of the John W. Kluge Prize for his lifetime achievement in the humanities.

Degrees offered

The Faculty offers both undergraduate and postgraduate level degree programmes.

Undergraduate
 	Anthropology
	Chinese Language and Literature
       Cultural Management
	Cultural Studies
	English
	Fine Arts
	History
	Japanese Studies
	Linguistics
	Music
	Philosophy
	Religious Studies
	Theology
	Translation

In addition, the faculty also offers the following programmes to students:

	BA (Translation) and JD: A double-degree programme, where JD is a postgraduate degree, jointly offered with the Faculty of Law.
	LLB and BA (Translation): A double-degree programme, jointly offered with the Faculty of Law.
	BA (Chinese Language and Literature) and BEd (Chinese Language Education): A co-terminal double-degree programme, jointly offered with the Faculty of Education.
	BA (English Studies) and BEd (English Language Education): A co-terminal double-degree programme, jointly offered with the Faculty of Education.

Postgraduate

Research (Doctor/Master)
	Anthropology
	Chinese Language and Literature
	Cultural Studies
	Applied English Linguistics
	Literary Studies
	Fine Arts (Master only)
	History of Chinese Art
	History
	Japanese Studies (Master only)
	Linguistics
	Music
	Philosophy
	Religious Studies
	Translation

Taught (Master)
	Anthropology
	Anthropology of Chinese Societies
	Chinese Language and Literature
	Intercultural Studies
	Cultural Management
	Visual Culture Studies
	Applied English Linguistics
	Fine Arts
	Comparative and Public History
	Japanese Language and Teaching
	Linguistics
	Chinese Linguistics and Language Acquisition
	Music
	Philosophy
	Religious Studies
	Christian Studies
	Divinity
	Theological Studies
	Translation
	Computer-Aided Translation

Taught (Postgraduate Diploma)
	Cultural Anthropology
	Chinese Language and Literature

Honorary professors
 The current Dean of the Faculty of Arts: Professor Leung Yuen Sang 
 Associate Dean of Arts (Student Affairs): Professor Cheng Chung Yi
 Associate Dean of Arts (Education): Professor Lai Pan Chiu
 Associate Dean of Arts (Research): Professor Thomas Lee Hun Tak
 Sin Wai Kin Professor of Chinese Culture: Professor Leo Ou Fan Lee
 Wei Lun Professor of Humanities: Professor Pai Hsien-yung
 Professor of Humanities: Professor Zhao Zhenkai (Bei Dao)

Campus
The headquarters of the Faculty of Arts is at the Fung King Hey Building located in The Chinese University of Hong Kong.

See also
 Chinese University of Hong Kong
 Department of Fine Arts, Chinese University of Hong Kong
 Faculty of Arts
 University of Hong Kong Faculty of Arts

References

External links
 the Faculty of Arts of CUHK Official website

Educational institutions established in 1963
Chinese University of Hong Kong
1963 establishments in Hong Kong